Trenton is an unincorporated community in Saline County, Kansas, United States.  It is located northwest of Salina at the intersection of Gerard Road and Pleasant Hill Road, next to an abandoned railroad.

Education
The community is served by Salina USD 305 public school district.

Notable people
 Randal F. Dickey (1899–1975), California state politician, was born in Trenton.

References

Further reading

External links
 Saline County maps: Current, Historic, KDOT

Unincorporated communities in Saline County, Kansas
Unincorporated communities in Kansas